Claudio Achillini (Latin Claudius Achillinus; 18 September 1574 – 1 October 1640) was an Italian philosopher, theologian, mathematician, poet, and jurist.

Biography 
Born in Bologna, he was grandson to Giovanni Filoteo Achillini and grand-nephew to Alessandro Achillini. He was professor of jurisprudence for several years at his native Bologna, Parma, and Ferrara, with the highest reputation. So much admiration did his learning excite, that inscriptions to his honor were placed in the schools in his lifetime. He was a member of a number of learned and literary societies, including the Accademia dei Lincei.

On February 9, 1621, Achillini went to Rome, where he obtained great promises of preferment from popes and cardinals, but they proved only promises. Odoardo Farnese, duke of Parma, engaged him however on very liberal terms, to occupy the chair of law in his university. He wrote the text for a play with music by Monteverdi presented during wedding celebrations at the Farnese court in Parma in 1628. As Jaynie Anderson has suggested, Achillini may have devised the program for Agostino Carracci's frescoes in the Palazzo del Giardino.

Achillini ended his career in Bologna, returning to a chair at the university, where he was one of Carlo Cesare Malvasia's teachers. Achillini was a particular friend of Giambattista Marino, whose style in poetry he imitated, occasionally lapsing into the excesses of extravagant metaphors. In the controversies that broke out after the publication of Marino's Adone (Paris, 1623), Achillini apparently encouraged Girolamo Aleandro to write his Difesa (1629) in response to Stigliani's attack on the poem in the Occhiale (1627). Though a strong partisan of Marino, even Achillini tempered some of the more extravagant elements in his own writing in the later years. Twentieth-century critics have in part overturned the terms of the relationship between Achillini and Marino, making evident instead Marino's debt to the former.

His first collection of poems and prose was published in 1632, although he had published many poems in the preceding decades. A canzone, which he addressed to Louis XIII on the birth of the dauphin, is said to have been rewarded by Cardinal Richelieu with a gold chain or collar worth 1000 crowns; this reward was not given, as some have asserted, for the famous sonnet beginning, Sudate o fuochi, a preparar metalli; (Sweat, fires, in order to forge metal) and which was severely criticized by Manzoni and was parodied by Crudeli in one beginning, Sudate o forni, a preparar pagnotte, (Sweat, O ye ovens! in preparing cakes!)

Achillini's poems were first published at Bologna and were reprinted several times (1633, 1650, 1651,1656, 1662, 1673, 1677 and 1680). He also printed a volume of Latin letters and an exchange of letters with his friend Agostino Mascardi on the plague of 1630, published in Bologna in 1630 and in Rome in 1631.

Works

References

Bibliography 
 
 
 

1574 births
1640 deaths
Writers from Bologna
Italian poets
Italian male poets
17th-century Italian poets
17th-century Italian male writers
Members of the Lincean Academy
17th-century Italian jurists
17th-century Latin-language writers
Baroque writers